Menghu Islet (Tiger Island) is an islet located southwest of Lesser Kinmen (Lieyu) in Lieyu Township, Kinmen County (Quemoy), Fujian Province, Republic of China (Taiwan). The islet was originally named  Hu-tzu Hsü (Hu-tzu Hsu).

History

In 1965, the island was given its present name.

In 2006, a Chinese fishing ship carrying 198 Chinese box turtles for illicit sale in Fujian was caught in the waters adjacent to Menghu Islet.

On November 3, 2017, a fishing ship with five crew members from Longhai City, Zhangzhou, Fujian, China was caught in the waters adjacent to Menghu Islet.

On July 23, 2019, Ho Cheng (賀政), the new leader of the ROC Army Kinmen Defense Command (陸軍金門防衛指揮部), visited the soldiers on Shi Islet and Menghu Islet.

After 10 PM on August 14, 2019, two members of the Kinmen branch of the Coast Guard Administration (Taiwan) were severely injured when they jumped from their ship onto a fishing ship from Mainland China which had been caught fishing in the waters around Menghu Islet.

Geography

See also
 List of islands of Taiwan
 Tiger in Chinese culture

References

Islands of Fujian, Republic of China
Landforms of Kinmen County
Lieyu Township